Wang Haojun (born 18 May 1984), also known as Laurent Wang, is a Chinese actor. He graduated from Shanghai Theatre Academy. He made his film debut in 2006 in Closet Enemy as Wu Xian.

Filmography

References 

1984 births
Living people
Male actors from Suzhou
Shanghai Theatre Academy alumni